The U.S. state of Delaware first required its residents to register their motor vehicles in 1905. Registrants provided their own license plates for display until 1909, when the state began to issue plates.

, plates are issued by the Delaware Department of Transportation (DelDOT) through its Division of Motor Vehicles. Only rear plates have been required on standard passenger vehicles since 1945. All plates issued since 1942 can still be used with current stickers. Authorized reproductions of porcelain enamel plates can be obtained through a private vendor, provided they fall within the state's guidelines.

The first Delaware license plate that complied with these standards was issued in 1958.

Passenger baseplates

1909 to 1942
No slogans were used on passenger plates during the period covered by this subsection.

1942 to present

Notes:
1 The state recycles serials, so they can be found on any base.
2 Serials 1, 2 and 3 reserved for the Governor, Lieutenant Governor and Secretary of State respectively. Plates with these serials are blue on gold with the state's coat of arms at the left.

Non-passenger plates
Delaware does not use leading zeros on its plates, so serials are composed of a variable number of digits.

Optional plates
Delaware does not use leading zeros on its plates, so serials are composed of a variable number of digits.

References

External links
Delaware license plates, 1969–present

Delaware
Road transportation in Delaware
Delaware transportation-related lists